The Partly Cloudy Patriot is a book published in 2002, by Sarah Vowell, a contributing editor for the WBEZ / Public Radio International program This American Life. This book is a collection of essays about American history and the author's own reflections on several matters.

The chapters include scenes from Vowell's vacations in history tourism, an open letter to Bill Clinton about his presidential library, and stories about her own past. Also in these readings is a script about her story and love for a young man thousands of miles away named Ray.

Audiobook 
The audiobook features music by They Might Be Giants and a cast including:

 Conan O'Brien as Abraham Lincoln
 Seth Green as Congressman Mike Synar
 Stephen Colbert as Al Gore
 David Cross as Theodore Roosevelt
 Paul Begala as George W. Bush
 Michael Chabon as Walt Whitman
 Norman Lear as "Kevin"

References

External links
The Partly Cloudy Patriot at This Might Be A Wiki
Book discussion with Vowell and Ira Glass on The Partly Cloudy Patriot, C-SPAN, November 19, 2002

2002 non-fiction books
Books by Sarah Vowell
They Might Be Giants